Classic Rock Gold is a two-disc compilation album released in 2005. It features thirty-three of the greatest hits to come out of classic rock, many of which are from the Universal Music Group catalogue.

The cover features, clockwise from the top left: Whitesnake, Lynyrd Skynyrd, Steppenwolf, Scorpions, Joe Walsh, Rod Stewart and Peter Frampton (all of which recorded for labels that were later merged into what is now Universal Music Group).

Track listing

Disc one
 Steppenwolf – "Born to Be Wild" (3:30) (Bonfire) (1968)
 Santana – "Evil Ways" (3:57) (Henry/Zack) (1970)
 The Guess Who – "American Woman" (5:07) (Bachman/Cummings/Kale/Peterson) (1970)
 Free – "All Right Now" (5:30) (Rodgers/Fraser) (1973)
 Jethro Tull – "Locomotive Breath" (4:33) (Anderson) (1972)
 The James Gang – "Walk Away" (3:34) (Walsh) (1972)
 Rod Stewart – "Maggie May" (5:46) (Stewart) (1971)
 Ten Years After – "I'd Love to Change the World" (3:44) (Lee) (1971)
 The Hollies – "Long Cool Woman (In a Black Dress)" (3:17) (Clarke/Cook/Greenaway) (1972)
 The Edgar Winter Group – "Frankenstein" (4:45) (Winter) (1973)
 Elton John – "Saturday Night's Alright for Fighting" (4:55) (John/Taupin) (1973)
 Grand Funk Railroad – "We're an American Band" (3:26) (Brewer) (1974)
 Joe Walsh – "Rocky Mountain Way" (5:16) (Walsh/Grace/Passarelli/Vitale) (1973)
 The Doobie Brothers – "China Grove" (3:16) (Johnston) (1974)
 Golden Earring – "Radar Love" (6:25) (Hay/Kooymans) (1974)
 Lynyrd Skynyrd – "Sweet Home Alabama" (4:41) (Van Zant/King/Rossington) (1974)
 Bachman–Turner Overdrive – "You Ain't Seen Nothing Yet" (3:53) (Bachman) (1974)

Disc two
 Bad Company – "Bad Company" (4:48) (Rodgers/Kirke) (1973)
 Nazareth – "Hair of the Dog" (4:09) (1975)
 Head East – "Never Been Any Reason" (5:11) (1975)
 Foghat – "Slow Ride" [Single version] (3:56) (Peverett) (1976)
 Peter Frampton – "Show Me the Way" [Live] (4:39) (Frampton) (1976)
 Blue Öyster Cult – "(Don't Fear) The Reaper" (5:09) (Roeser) (1976)
 Foreigner – "Cold as Ice" [Single version] (3:20) (Gramm/Jones) (1977)
 Ted Nugent – "Cat Scratch Fever" (3:39) (Nugent) (1978)
 The Cars – "Just What I Needed" (3:45) (Ocasek) (1979)
 Eddie Money – "Two Tickets to Paradise" (3:49) (Money) (1978)
 Cheap Trick – "I Want You to Want Me" [Live] (3:42) (Nielsen) (1979)
 .38 Special – "Hold On Loosely" (4:40) (Barnes/Carlisi/Peterik) (1981)
 Red Rider – "Lunatic Fringe" (4:22) (Cochrane) (1981)
 Billy Idol – "White Wedding" (4:13) (Idol) (1982)
 Scorpions – "Rock You Like a Hurricane" (4:12) (Schenker/Meine/Rarebell) (1984)
 Whitesnake – "Here I Go Again" (4:35) (Coverdale/Marsden) (1987)

Personnel 

Jorgen Angel – photography
Randy Bachman – producer
Bad Company – producer
Roy Thomas Baker – producer
Bruce Botnick – producer
Roger Boyd – producer
Emily Cagan – product manager
Paul Canty – photography, cover photo
Manny Charlton – producer
Brent Dangerfield – producer
Cliff Davies – producer
Rick Derringer – producer
Dieter Dierks – producer
Henry Diltz – photography, cover photo
Jack Douglas – producer
Gus Dudgeon – producer
Keith Forsey – producer
Simon Fowler – photography
Peter Frampton – producer
Lew Futterman – producer
Richie Gallo – photography
The Hollies – producer
Nick Jameson – producer
Al Kooper – producer
Murray Krugman – producer
Richard Landis – producer
Pat Lawrence – compilation producer

David Lucas – producer
Gavin Lurssen – mastering
Gary Lyons – producer
Ross Marino – photography, cover photo
Ian McDonald – collaboration
Gabriel Mekler – producer
Rodney Mills – producer
Ryan Null – photo research
Keith Olsen – producer
Sandy Pearlman – producer
Michael Putland – photography, cover photo
Ron Richards – producer
Todd Rundgren – producer
Santana – producer
Dana Smart – compilation producer
Shannon Steckloff – production coordination
Dave Steen – photography, cover photo
Rod Stewart – producer
Mike Stone – producer
Bill Szymczyk – producer
Ted Templeman – producer
Joe Walsh – producer
Tom Werman – producer
Chris Wright – executive producer
Michael Zagaris - photography

See also
 Classic rock
 Album-oriented rock

References

2005 greatest hits albums
Gold series albums
Rock compilation albums